Graven is a surname. Notable people with the surname include:

Heather Graven, American atmospheric scientist
Henry Norman Graven (1893–1970), American judge
Otto Frank Graven (born 1975), South African racing driver
Philip S. Graven (1892–1977), American doctor and psychoanalyst